Greenview can refer to:

Australia 
 Greenview, Queensland, a locality in the South Burnett Region, Queensland

Canada 
 Greenview, Calgary, a neighbourhood in Calgary, Alberta
 Greenview, Edmonton, a neighbourhood in Edmonton, Alberta
 Municipal District of Greenview No. 16, a municipal district in Alberta

United States 
 Greenview, California
 Greenview, Illinois